Pär Aron Borg (4 July 1776 – 22 April 1839) was a Swedish educator and a pioneer in the education for the blind and deaf.

Biography
Borg was born in the parish of Avesta in Dalarna, Sweden. After studies at Uppsala University (1796–1798), he became a secretary in the Central Government Office in Stockholm.

After having seen a play where a deaf boy communicated by gestures, he was inspired to create a manual alphabet. He began to educate deaf and blind students regularly in 1808. Following the example of l'Abbé de l'Épée founded by  Charles-Michel de l'Épée in Paris, in 1809 he founded  (Public Institute of the Blind and Deaf at Manilla; Manillaskolan). The institution received support from Queen Hedwig Elizabeth Charlotte (1759–1818). The school had deaf teachers, and the instruction was taught in sign language. 

Among his notable students was concert singer, composer and poet Charlotta Seuerling (1782/1784–1828). He was the guardian and mentor of Johanna Berglind (1816–1903), also an important figure in the history of the education of the deaf in Sweden.

Borg made a trip to Portugal in 1823–1828, where he founded a school for the deaf; thereby Portugal was given the same manual alphabet as Sweden.
Pär Aron Borg died in 1839 and was succeeded as director of the institute by his son, Ossian Edmund Borg (1812–1892).

References

Other sources
Svensk Läraretidning nr 29, 1901, om Borg 
Om Borg på Manillas skoltidning

Related reading
Jean-Nicolas Bouilly (1993) Abbé de l'Épée eller Den döfve och dumbe: historiskt skådespel uti 5 acter (SIH-läromedel)  

1776 births
1839 deaths
People from Dalarna
Uppsala University  alumni
Swedish educators
19th-century Swedish educators
People involved with sign language
Burials at Norra begravningsplatsen
Educators of the deaf
Educators of the blind
School founders